Dehsar (also Romanized as Deh Sar) is a village in Ahandan Rural District, in the Central District of Lahijan County, Gilan Province, Iran. At the 2006 census, its population was 398, in 103 families.

References 

Populated places in Lahijan County